Srinivasa or Venkateswara is a form of the Hindu god Vishnu.

Srinivasa may also refer to:

People 
 Srinivasa Ramanujan (1887–1920), Indian mathematician
 S. R. Srinivasa Varadhan (born 1940), Indian-American mathematician
 Srinivasa Murthy (born 1949), Indian actor and television director
 Srinivasa Reddy (born 1973), Telugu comedian and actor

See also 
 Srinivasa Iyengar (disambiguation)
 Srinivas

Hindu given names
Sanskrit-language names
Indian given names
Telugu names